Driftwood is a 1928 American silent drama film directed by Christy Cabanne and starring Don Alvarado, Marceline Day and Alan Roscoe.

Cast
 Don Alvarado as Jim Curtis  
 Marceline Day as Daisy Smith  
 Alan Roscoe as Johnson  
 Jack W. Johnston as Barlow 
 Fred Holmes as Doc Prouty 
 Fritzi Brunette as Lola  
 Nora Cecil as Mrs. Prouty 
 Joseph P. Mack as Johnson's Henchman

References

Bibliography
 Monaco, James. The Encyclopedia of Film. Perigee Books, 1991.

External links

1928 films
1928 drama films
Silent American drama films
Films directed by Christy Cabanne
1920s English-language films
American black-and-white films
Columbia Pictures films
American silent feature films
Films set in Oceania
Films based on short fiction
1920s American films